Istiblennius unicolor, the pallid rockskipper, is a species of combtooth blenny found on coral reefs in the western Indian Ocean.

References

unicolor
Fish described in 1838